Knyaginino is a town and the administrative center of Knyagininsky District in Nizhny Novgorod Oblast, Russia, located on the Imza River,  southeast of Nizhny Novgorod, the administrative center of the oblast. Population:

History
It was first mentioned in the second half of the 16th century as an estate of Mikhail Vorotynsky. In 1779, it was granted town rights. At that time, it was known as Knyaginin; this name was used until 1917. In 1926, it was demoted to a rural locality (selo) status. It was granted urban-type settlement status in 1968 and town status in 1998.

Administrative and municipal status
Within the framework of administrative divisions, Knyaginino serves as the administrative center of Knyagininsky District. As an administrative division, it is, together with the village of Gorshkovo, incorporated within Knyagininsky District as the town of district significance of Knyaginino. As a municipal division, the town of district significance of Knyaginino is incorporated within Knyagininsky Municipal District as Knyaginino Urban Settlement.

Economy
Major industrial enterprises in Knyaginino include a milk plant, a textile factory, and a fur manufacture.

References

Notes

Sources

Cities and towns in Nizhny Novgorod Oblast
Knyagininsky District
Knyagininsky Uyezd
Populated places established in the 16th century